Idolomorpha is a genus of mantises in the family Empusidae.

See also
List of mantis genera and species

References

Empusidae
Mantodea genera